is a mascot for Sanwa Bank designed by Osamu Tezuka. It was later turned into a manga series by Tezuka and an anime series from 1973.

The hero of Wansa-kun was Wansa, a puppy who is sold for a pittance, then escapes, and spends much of the rest of the series looking for his mother. Tezuka never completed the manga version of the series.

In 1973 an animated series based on the manga was made, produced by Yoshinobu Nishizaki and broadcast by Kansai Telecasting Corporation. As with the earlier Triton of the Sea, Tezuka had little-to-no involvement in this series and Wansa-kun ultimately ended up being the last series produced by the original Mushi Production before its bankruptcy.

The anime series lasted 26 episodes. The first 21 episodes were very comedic in nature, but the final five episodes took a more dramatic turn, when Wansa began his search for his mother. Unlike the manga version, which was never completed, he succeeded in the final episode of the anime series.

After the series finished production, Nishizaki and many of his production team on this series went to work on Space Battleship Yamato.

In 2016 between 18th till 28 August Osamu Tezuka's "Little Wansa" stage play adaptation was announced.

Cast

Noriko Ohara as Wansa
Ichirô Nagai as Megane
Jouji Yanami as Lupin
Kaneta Kimotsuki as Gamble
Kei Tomiyama as Kuma
Masako Nozawa as Kouta

References

External links
 

1971 manga
1973 anime television series debuts
Fuji TV original programming
Osamu Tezuka anime
Osamu Tezuka characters
Osamu Tezuka manga
Dog mascots
Television mascots
Child characters in television
Child characters in advertising
Mascots introduced in 1971